Romania competed at the 1964 Summer Olympics in Tokyo, Japan. 138 competitors, 108 men and 30 women, took part in 76 events in 13 sports.

Medalists

|  style="text-align:left; width:72%; vertical-align:top;"|

| style="text-align:left; width:23%; vertical-align:top;"|

Gold
 Iolanda Balaş — Athletics, Women's High Jump
 Mihaela Peneş — Athletics, Women's Javelin Throw

Silver
 Andrei Igorov — Canoeing, Men's C1 1000m Canadian Singles
 Hilde Lauer — Canoeing, Women's K1 500m Kayak Singles
 Ion Tripşa — Shooting, Men's Rapid-Fire Pistol
 Valeriu Bularca — Wrestling, Men's Greco-Roman Lightweight

Bronze
 Lia Manoliu — Athletics, Women's Discus Throw
 Aurel Vernescu — Canoeing, Men's K1 1000m Kayak Singles
 Simion Cuciuc, Atanase Sciotnic, Mihai Țurcaș, and Aurel Vernescu — Canoeing, Men's K4 1000m Kayak Fours
 Hilde Lauer and Cornelia Sideri — Canoeing, Women's K2 500m Kayak Pairs
 Dumitru Pârvulescu — Wrestling, Men's Greco-Roman Flyweight
 Ion Cernea — Wrestling, Men's Greco-Roman Bantamweight

Athletics

 Women's High Jump
Iolanda Balaş
 Qualification- 1.70 m
 Final:-1.90 m, OR ( Gold Medal)
Women's Discus
Lia Manoliu
Qualification- 53.64 m
Final-56.94 m ( Bronze Medal)
Olimpia Cataramă
Qualification-53.20 m
Final-53.08 m (8th place)
Women's Javelin
Maria Diaconescu
Qualification-51.12 m
Final-53.71 m (6th place)
Mihaela Peneş
Qualification-51.19 m
Final-60.54 m ( Gold Medal)
Women's Shot Put
Ana Sǎlǎgean
Qualification-15.31 m not qualified(no ranking)
Women's Long Jump
Viorica Viscopoleanu
Qualification-6.37 m
Final-6.35 m (5th place)
Men's 5000 m
Andrei Barabaș
Heat-14:00.2 not qualified (no ranking)
Marathon
Constantin Grecescu 2:30:42.6 (36th place)
Triple Jump
Şerban Ciochină
Qualification-15.31 m
Final-16.23 m (5th place)
50 km Walk
Ilie Popa 2:19:03.0 (28th place)

Boxing

Flyweight
Constantin Ciucǎ def. Henry (Canada), def. Cuylenburg (Ceylon),lost to Olech (Poland)→6th place
Bantamweight
Nicolae Puiu def. Van der Walt (Northern Rhodesia), def. Johnson (U.S.A.), lost to Sakurai (Japan)→5th place
Featherweight
Constantin Crudu def. Caminero (Cuba), def. Limmonen (Finland), lost to Stepashkin (Soviet Union)→5th place
Light-Welterweight
Iosif Mihalic def. König (Austria), def. Fasoli (Italy), lost to Kulej (Poland)→5th place
Welterweight
Niculescu def. Gutierrez (Mexico), lost to Mabwa (Uganda)
Light-Middleweight
Mârza def. Lee (South Korea), def. Elmahas (United Arab Republic), lost to Grzesiak(Poland)→7th place
Middleweight
Ion Monea def. Kim (South Korea), lost to Schulz (Germany United Team)
Light-Heavyweight
Gheorghe Negrea lost to Kiselyov (Soviet Union)
Heavyweight
Vasile Mariuţan def. Pandov (Bulgaria),lost to Ros (Italy)

Canoeing

Cycling

Five cyclists represented Romania in 1964.

Individual road race
 Gabriel Moiceanu
 Constantin Ciocan
 Ion Cosma
 Gheorghe Bădără

Team time trial
 Gheorghe Bădără
 Constantin Ciocan
 Ion Cosma
 Emil Rusu

Fencing

Eleven fencers, six men and five women, represented Romania in 1964.

Women's foil
Ana Ene-Derșidan qualified from Round 1 (2v, 2 d, barrage), qualified from Round 2 (3v,2 d), lost in Round 3 to Antonella Ragno (Italy) (8-4)
Olga Orban-Szabo qualified from Round 1 (3 v,2 d), qualified from Round 2 (4 v, 1 d), lost in Round 3 to Giovanna Masciotta(Italy) (8-6)
Maria Vicol eliminated in Round 1 (2 v, 3 d)

Women's team foil
Round 1
 Defeated U.S.A. (9-1)
Round 2
 Lost to Soviet Union (4-9)
Playoff for 5th place
 Defeated France (9-6)→5th place
Team Roster:
Olga Orban-Szabo
Ana Ene-Derșidan
Ileana Gyulai
Ecaterina Stahl
Maria Vicol

Men's foil
Ion Drîmbă qualified from Round 1 (4 v, 1 d), qualified from Round 2 (3 v, 2 d), def.in Round 3 Naser Madani (Iran)(10-4), lost in Round 4 to Roland Losert (Austria)(6-10)
Ștefan Haukler qualified from Round 1 (6 v,0 d), eliminated in Round 2 (2 v, 3 d)
Tănase Mureșanu qualified from Round 1 (4 v,1 d), eliminated in Round 2 (2 v,3 d, barrage)

Men's team foil
First round
 Def. Argentina (9-0)
 Def. France (9-5)
 Lost to U.S.A. (8-8,54-62 t.d.)
Quarterfinals
 Lost to Poland (5-9)
5-8 Playoff
 Def. Hungary (9-5)
 Lost to Germany United Team (8-8;57-60 t.d.)→6th place
Team Roster
 Ion Drîmbă
Ștefan Haukler
Tănase Mureșanu
Iuliu Falb
Attila Csipler

Men's épée
Ștefan Haukler qualified from Round 1 (4 v,3 d), eliminated in Round 2 (0 v, 5 d)

Men's sabre
Tănase Mureșanu qualified from Round 1 (6 v, 0 d), qualified from Round 2 (4 v,2 d), lost in Round 3 to Marcel Parent (France) (10-12)
Octavian Vintilă qualified from Round 1 (3 v, 2 d), eliminated in Round 2 (1 v, 6 d)
Ion Drîmbă qualified from Round 1 (4 v,1 d), eliminated in Round 2 (3 v, 3 d)

Men's team sabre
Round 1
 Def. Australia (9-3)
 Def. Great Britain (10-6)
Quarterfinals
 Lost to France (6-8)
5-7 playoff
 Lost to Hungary (0-9)→7th place
Team Roster
Attila Csipler
Octavian Vintilă
Tănase Mureșanu
Ion Drîmbă

Football

Group stage
 Defeated Mexico (3-1)
 Drew with Germany United Team (1-1)
 Defeated Iran (1-0)
Quarterfinals
 Lost to Hungary (0-2)
Consolation round 1
 Defeated Ghana (4-2)
Consolation round 2
 Defeated Yugoslavia (3-0) → 5th place
Team Roster
 Ilie Datcu
 Ilie Greavu
 Ion Nunweiller
 Dan Coe
 Bujor Hălmăgeanu
 Emil Petru
 Constantin Koszka
 Ion Pârcălab
 Gheorghe Constantin
 Ion Gheorghe Ionescu
 Carol Creiniceanu
 Emerich Jenei
 Cornel Pavlovici
 Marin Andrei
 Mircea Petescu
 Dumitru Ivan
 Sorin Avram
 Nicolae Georgescu

Gymnastics

Rowing

Shooting

Nine shooters represented Romania in 1964.

25 m pistol
 Ion Tripșa
 Marcel Roșca

50 m pistol
 Neagu Bratu
 Gavril Maghiar

50 m rifle, three positions
 Ion Olărescu
 Nicolae Rotaru

50 m rifle, prone
 Nicolae Rotaru
 Traian Cogut

Trap
 Ion Dumitrescu
 Gheorghe Enache

Volleyball

Men's Team Competition
 Round Robin
 Lost to Soviet Union (0-3)
 Defeated Brazil (3-0)
 Defeated Bulgaria (3-2)
 Defeated Netherlands (3-0)
 Defeated South Korea (3-2)
 Defeated Hungary (3-1)
 Lost to Czechoslovakia (1-3)
 Lost to Japan (0-3)
 Defeated United States (3-1) → 4th place
Team Roster
 Gheorghe Fieraru
 Horaţiu Nicolau
 Aurel Drăgan
 Iuliu Szőcs
 William Schreiber
 Mihai Grigorovici
 Davila Plocon
 Nicolae Bărbuţă
 Eduard Derzsi
 Mihai Chezan
 Constantin Ganciu
 Mihai Coste

Women's Team Competition
 Round Robin
 Lost to Soviet Union (0-3)
 Lost to Japan (0-3)
 Defeated United States (3-0)
 Defeated South Korea (3-0)
 Lost to Poland (0-3) → 4th place
Team Roster
Ana Mocan
Cornelia Lăzeanu
Natalia Todorovschi
Doina Ivănescu
Doina Rodica Popescu
Sonia Colceru
Lia Vanea
Alexandrina Chezan
Ileana Enculescu
Elisabeta Goloşie
Marina Stanca

Water polo

First Round
 Lost to Italy (3-4)
 Defeated Japan (9-4)

Semifinal Round
 Defeated Germany United Team (5-4)
 Drew with Soviet Union (2-2)
5-8 Tournament
 Defeated the Netherlands (6-1)
 Lost to Belgium (3-5)→ 5th place
Team Roster
Mircea Ştefănescu (water polo)
Anatolie Grinţescu
Aurel Zahan
Alexandru Szabó
Ştefan Kroner
Cornel Mărculescu
Nicolae Firoiu
Gruia Novac
Iosif Kuliniac
Cosma Liţă
Emil Mureșanu

Weightlifting

Wrestling

Freestyle Wrestling
52 kg
Gheorghe Tapalagă lost to Aliev(Soviet Union) (decision), lost to Georgiev (Bulgaria) (fall 9'19")
78 kg
Ştefan Tâmpa lost to Watanabe (Japan) (decision), lost to Heinze (Germany Unified Team) (decision)
97 kg
Ferenc Ballo lost to Medved (Soviet Union) (fall 2'12")drew with Conine (U.S.A.) (2-2)
+97 kg
Ştefan Stângu drew with Kubat (Czechoslovakia) (2-2), lost to Dzhiber (Bulgaria) (decision)

Greco-Roman Style Wrestling
52 kg
Dumitru Pârvulescu def. Jensen (Denmark) (decision), def. Del Rio (Mexico) (fall 2'55"), def. Savadov (Soviet Union) (decision), lost to Kerezov (Bulgaria) (decision), lost to Hanahara (Japan) (fall 8'19")(→  Bronze Medal)
57 kg
Ion Cernea drew with Varga (Hungary)  def. Knitter (Poland) (decision), def. Švec (Czechoslovakia) (decision), def. Başergil (Turkey) (decision), lost to Trestyanski (Soviet Union) (decision)(→  Bronze Medal)
63 kg
Marin Bolocan lost to Olsson (Sweden) (decision), def. Sayed (Afghanistan) (fall 3'56"),drew with Mirmalek (Iran), lost to Mansour (United Arab Republic) (decision)
70 kg
Valeriu Bularca drew with Tapio (Finland), def. Kim (South Korea) (decision), def. Burke (U.S.A.) (foul 7'52"), def. Jonsson (Sweden) (decision), drew with Ayvaz (Turkey); entered tiebreak for places 2–4; defeated Gvanseladze (Soviet Union (decision)), drew with Fujita (Japan)(→  Silver Medal)
78 kg
Ion Ţăranu def. Todorov (Bulgaria) (decision), drew with Kolesov (Soviet Union), def. Asghian (Iran) (decision), drew with Laakso(Finland)→5th place
82 kg
Gheorghe Popovici drew with Olenik (Soviet Union), lost with Metz (Germany United Team) (decision)
87 kg
Nicolae Martinescu drew with Sosnowski (Poland), def. Bulgarelli (Italy)(decision), def. Yilmaz (Turkey) (decision), def. Wiesberger (Austria) (decision), lost with Radev (Bulgaria)(decision)→4th place
+97 kg
Ştefan Stângu drew with Kasabov (Bulgaria), lost to Svensson (Sweden) (decision).

References

External links
Official Olympic reports

Nations at the 1964 Summer Olympics
1964
Olympics